Train Dreams is a novella by Denis Johnson. It was published on August 30, 2011, by Farrar, Straus and Giroux. It was originally published, in slightly different form, in the Summer 2002 issue of The Paris Review.

The novella details the life of Robert Grainier, an American railroad laborer, who lives a life of hermitage until he marries and has a daughter, only to lose both wife and child in a forest fire, and sink into isolation again. 

The novella won an O. Henry Award in 2003. It also won the 2002 Aga Khan Prize for Fiction. It was a finalist for the 2012 Pulitzer Prize for Fiction, but no award was given that year.

Plot
In summer 1917, a Chinese laborer is accused of stealing from the company stores of the Spokane International Railway in the Idaho Panhandle. Robert Grainier and the other white laborers attempt to throw him over the bridge they are constructing, but he escapes. Grainier stops in Meadow Creek and buys a bottle of sarsaparilla for his wife, Gladys, and their four-month-old daughter, Kate. Hiking home to his cabin, Grainier thinks he sees the Chinese man and believes he has cursed him.

In 1920, Grainier leaves for northwestern Washington to help repair the Robinson Gorge Bridge. He also cuts and transports timber for the Simpson Company. He meets fellow worker Arn Peeples, a fearless but superstitious old man who dangerously excavates tunnels with dynamite. Arn is later killed by a falling dead branch. In 1962 or 1963, Grainier watches young ironworkers build a new highway. In the mid-1950s, he sees the World's Fattest Man. He recalls seeing Elvis Presley's private train in Troy, Montana, and flying in a biplane in 1927.

Grainier was born in 1886 in Utah or Canada. In 1893, he arrived on the Great Northern Railway as an orphan in Fry, Idaho, and was adopted by a family. He witnesses the mass deportation of Chinese families from the town. In 1899, the towns of Fry and Eatonville were merged to form Bonners Ferry. Grainier quit school in his early teens and began fishing. One day, he stumbles upon a dying man named William Coswell Haley. He brings him a drink of water from his boot and leaves him to die alone.

Grainier is hired out to the railroad and local families, and works around town through his twenties. At 31 years old, he marries Gladys Olding. In summer 1920, Grainier returns to Idaho from working on the Robinson Gorge to find a massive wildfire has consumed the valley. His cabin is lost and his wife and daughter are nowhere to be found. The following spring, he returns to their cabin and believes he feels Gladys' spirit. One night while sleeping by the river, he sees her white bonnet "sailing past" above him. He lives there through summer, taking in a red dog as company. He hikes to Meadow Creek and takes a train to Bonners Ferry, staying there through winter. In March, he returns to the Moyea Valley and rebuilds his cabin. The red dog returns in June, with four puppies. Grainier befriends a Kootenai Indian named Bob, who drunkenly gets run over by trains.

Four years into living in his cabin, Grainier realizes he cannot continue to move out every summer to Washington and every winter to Bonners Ferry. By April 1925, he stays and works in town. In one job, he loads sacks of cornmeal aboard the Pinkham's wagon. After witnessing their grandson Hank collapse and die, Grainier buys their horses and wagon. Around this time, Grainier hears rumors about a wolf-girl.

Grainier is visited by a figure of his wife Gladys, who tells him she died after falling and breaking her back on rocks down by the river. Before drowning, she unknotted her bodice to allow Kate to crawl away and escape.

Thereafter, Grainier lives in his cabin, working one final summer in the Washington woods to pay for winter lodging for his horses. He travels on the Great Northern to Spokane, Washington, taking a ride on a plane. He meets his childhood friend Eddie Sauer, who returns with him to Meadow Creek.

Grainier continues to live in his cabin, despite having arthritis and rheumatism. When a pack of wolves comes upon his cabin one night, Grainier sees a wolf-girl and is convinced it is Kate. She growls and barks at him, but lets him splint her broken leg. She sleeps in his cabin but leaps out the window come morning. He never sees her again.

Robert Grainier dies in his sleep in November 1968. His body is discovered next spring by a pair of hikers. In a memory from 1935, Grainier attends a sideshow to see a "wolf-boy". The audience laugh at him but are shocked by his roar. The novella concludes, "And suddenly it all went black. And that time was gone forever."

Publication
Train Dreams was published by Farrar, Straus and Giroux on August 30, 2011. It was originally published, in slightly different form, in the Summer 2002 issue of The Paris Review.

The novella appeared at number 28 on The New York Times Hardcover Fiction best-sellers list on October 9, 2011.

Reception
Publishers Weekly called the novella "the synthesis of Johnson's epic sensibilities rendered in miniature in the clipped tone of Jesus' Son."

Writing for The New York Times Book Review, author Anthony Doerr praised the novella, writing, "What Johnson builds from the ashes of Grainier's life is a tender, lonesome and riveting story, an American epic writ small."

James Wood in The New Yorker rated Train Dreams "a severely lovely tale" and Eileen Battersby of The Irish Times declares that "Johnson's novella, Train Dreams, a daring lament to the American West, is a masterpiece which should have won him the Pulitzer Prize but was short-listed in a year that the jury decided not to award it."

Critical assessment

Style
Critics have widely discerned the influence of 20th Century American novelists in Train Dreams, most strikingly that of Ernest Hemingway, and in particular Johnson's use of the  declarative sentence, a hallmark of Hemingway's style.

Literary critic Anthony Wallace praises Johnson's sustained and skillful use of this stylistic device: "Johnson is indeed a very good Hemingway disciple, perhaps even a great one…the true, simple declarative sentence is alive and well here..." Wallace points out that Johnson's use of "free indirect discourse" serves to convey the simple and unaffected quality of his protagonist: "[M]ost of what we know about Grainier on the inside is achieved indirectly, suggestively" in the manner of Hemingway.

Critic James Wood praises Johnson's Hemingwayesque writing: "Johnson often uses an unobtrusive, free indirect style to inhabit the limited horizons of his characters", adding this caveat:

Theme
Train Dreams examines the personal repercussions that accompany overwhelming loss in an individual. Literary critic Alan Warner sums up Grainier's fate as follows:

Critic Anthony Wallace comments on this key thematic element in the novel:

Footnotes

Sources 
 
 
 Johnson, Denis. 2002. Train Dreams.  Farrar, Straus and Giroux, New York. 
 
 

2011 American novels
American novellas
American historical novels
Novels by Denis Johnson
Farrar, Straus and Giroux books
Third-person narrative novels
Novels set in Idaho
Novels set in Washington (state)
Novels set in British Columbia
Novels set in Montana
Novels about rail transport
Works originally published in The Paris Review